Kang Kuk-chol (born 27 May 1988) is a North Korean footballer.

Career statistics

International

References

1988 births
Living people
Sportspeople from Pyongyang
North Korean footballers
North Korea international footballers
Association football defenders